A Naked Girl on the Appian Way is a play by Richard Greenberg, initially produced by South Coast Repertory, Costa Mesa, California in 2005.

Production history
It was commissioned by South Coast Repertory and premiered there from April 1, 2005 through May 15.  

A Naked Girl on the Appian Way opened on Broadway in a Roundabout Theatre production at the American Airlines Theatre on October 6, 2005 and ran through  December 4, 2005.  Directed by Doug Hughes, it starred Jill Clayburgh, Richard Thomas and Matthew Morrison.

Plot
Cookbook author Bess Lapin and her husband Jeffrey live in the Hamptons with their 3 adopted children. Jeffrey, newly retired is also writing a book about the connection between business and art. Two of the children return from a European trip and the family gathers for a reunion.  Neighbors Elaine and her mother-in-law Sadie crash the welcome-home party. The returned children announce that they are planning to get married.

References

External links

Roundabout listing
Review, New York Times, October 7, 2005
Review from talkinbroadway.com, October 6, 2005 

2005 plays
Broadway plays
Plays by Richard Greenberg